A pervasive developmental disorder not otherwise specified (Including atypical autism) (PDD-NOS) is one of four disorders which have been collapsed into the diagnosis of autism spectrum disorder in the DSM-5 and also was one of the five disorders classified as a pervasive developmental disorder (PDD) in the DSM-IV. According to the DSM-4, PDD-NOS is a diagnosis that is used for " mild or severe pervasive deficits in the development of reciprocal social interaction and/or verbal and nonverbal communication skills, or when stereotyped behavior, interests, and/or activities are present, but the criteria are not met for a specific PDD" or for several other disorders.  PDD-NOS includes atypical autism, because the criteria for autistic disorder are not met, for instance because of late age of onset, atypical symptomatology, or subthreshold symptomatology, or all of these. Even though PDD-NOS is considered milder than typical autism, this is not always true. While some characteristics may be milder, others may be more severe.

Signs and symptoms
It is common for individuals with PDD-NOS to have more intact social skills and a lower level of intellectual deficit than individuals with other PDDs. Characteristics of many individuals with PDD-NOS are:
 Communication difficulties (e.g., using and understanding language)
 Difficulty with social behavior
 Uneven skill development (strengths in some areas and delays in others)
 Unusual play with toys and other objects
 Repetitive body movements or behavior patterns
 Preoccupation with fantasies that interfere and that are not normal to have at a certain age depending on social, cultural and religious norms.
 Unconventional perception of the world
 Maladaptive daydreaming, excessive daydreaming interfering with daily life

Diagnosis
PDD-NOS is an old diagnostic category. It is not included as an option for an Autism Spectrum Disorder and is not part of the DSM-5, but is included in the ICD-10, as either "atypical autism" or "pervasive developmental disorder, unspecified". It is also included in the ICD-11 as "Pervasive Developmental Disorder, Otherwise Specified".

The diagnosis of a pervasive developmental disorder not otherwise specified is given to individuals with difficulties in the areas of social interaction, communication, and/or stereotypic behavior patterns or interests, but who do not meet the full DSM-4 criteria for autism or another PDD. This does not necessarily mean that PDD-NOS is a milder disability than the other PDDs. It could only mean that individuals who receive this diagnosis do not meet the diagnostic criteria of the other PDDs, but that there is still a pervasive developmental disorder that affects the individual in the areas of communication, socialization, and behavior.

As for the other pervasive developmental disorders, the diagnosis of PDD-NOS requires the involvement of a team of specialists. The individual needs to undergo a full diagnostic evaluation, including a thorough medical, social, adaptive, motor skills and communication history. Other parts of an assessment can be behavioral rating scales, direct behavioral observations, psychological assessment, educational assessment, communication assessment, and occupational assessment.

Description of PDD-NOS merely as a "subthreshold" category without a more specific case definition poses methodological problems for research regarding the relatively heterogeneous group of people who receive this diagnosis. While it's true that children diagnosed with PDD-NOS, as a whole, show fewer intellectual deficits and are higher-functioning than autistic children, many others who fit the criteria for PDD-NOS have some autistic features but also have intellectual deficits that are so severe that it's difficult or impossible to tell whether some of the deficits come from the autism or from the severe to profound degree of intellectual disability itself. Furthermore, some others who fit the criteria for PDD-NOS come to professional attention at a later age, compared to those diagnosed with autism.

Subgroups
Studies suggest that persons with PDD-NOS belong to one of three very different subgroups:
 A high-functioning group (around 25 percent) whose symptoms more or less overlap with that of Asperger syndrome, while also not meeting the criteria for autistic disorder, but who completely differ from those with Asperger syndrome in terms of having a lag in language development and/or mild cognitive impairment. (The criteria for Asperger syndrome excludes a speech delay or a cognitive delay in early life.)
 Another group (around 25 percent) whose symptoms more closely resemble those of autism, but do not fully meet all its diagnostic signs and symptoms. This is because either the symptoms were recognized at a later age or because they were too young or have cognitive deficits that are too severe to properly identify all the symptoms of autism that they may have.
 The biggest group (around 50 percent) consists of those who meet all the diagnostic criteria for autistic disorder but whose stereotypical and repetitive behaviors are noticeably mild.

Treatment
There is no known cure for PDD-NOS, but there are interventions that can have a positive influence.

Some of the more common therapies and services include:
 Visual and environmental supports, visual schedules
 Social stories and comic strip conversations
 Speech therapy
 Physical and occupational therapy

References

External links 

Autism spectrum disorders
Neurological disorders in children
Learning disabilities

pl:Całościowe zaburzenie rozwoju nie zdiagnozowane inaczej